16th London Film Critics Circle Awards
8 March 1996

Film of the Year: 
 Babe 

British Film of the Year: 
 The Madness of King George 

The 16th London Film Critics Circle Awards, honouring the best in film for 1995, were announced by the London Film Critics Circle in 1996.

Winners
Film of the Year
Babe

British Film of the Year
The Madness of King George

Foreign Language Film of the Year
Il Postino • Italy

Director of the Year
Peter Jackson - Heavenly Creatures

British Director of the Year
Michael Radford - Il Postino

Screenwriter of the Year
Paul Attanasio - Quiz Show and Disclosure

British Screenwriter of the Year
Alan Bennett - The Madness of King George

Actor of the Year
Johnny Depp - Ed Wood and Don Juan DeMarco

Actress of the Year
Nicole Kidman - To Die For

British Actor of the Year
Nigel Hawthorne - The Madness of King George

British Actress of the Year
Kate Winslet - Heavenly Creatures

Newcomer of the Year
Chris Noonan - Babe

British Newcomer of the Year
Danny Boyle - Shallow Grave

British Technical Achievement of the Year
Ken Adam - The Madness of King George

British Producer of the Year
Simon Fields and Peter Chelsom - Funny Bones

Special Achievement Award
John Gielgud
Peter Rogers

Dilys Powell Award
Wendy Hiller

External links
IMDB
Official Website

1
1995 film awards
1995 in London
1995 in British cinema